Matthew James Somner (born 8 December 1982) is a footballer who played for Walton & Hersham. A utility player, Somner can play in numerous position across both defence and midfield. Born in England, he made two appearances for the Wales U21 national team.

Career
Born in Isleworth, London, Somner began his career with local club Brentford, situated just 2 km from his native Isleworth. His professional debut came on 1 May 2001, in a 6–0 defeat to Swansea City. During his time at Griffin Park, he was called into the Wales-U21 squad to play Italy-U21s in 2003. The game finished disastrously for Wales as they lost 8–1.

Somner spent four seasons at Brentford, where he played in 93 games, before his contract was cancelled my mutual consent on 31 January 2005. He joined League Two side Cambridge United two days later, having had a loan spell at the club in December 2004. He was offered a new contract at the end of the season, though turned it down and instead joined Bristol Rovers on non-contract terms. He made only one appearance before signing for Conference National side Aldershot Town on 19 August 2005.

His contract not renewed at Aldershot, Somner joined Notts County in 2006, playing in 62 games over two seasons.

Somner was released by Notts County in 2008, and signed for Mansfield Town on 1 August 2008. He joined Altrincham on loan in November 2010.

On 31 January 2011, Somner signed for Forest Green Rovers after being released by Mansfield. He made his debut for Forest Green on 5 February 2011 in a home win against Hayes & Yeading United. Somner revealed on his Twitter page ahead of Rovers final game of the season that he would not be offered a new contract by the club. He would go on to score for Forest Green in their last game of the season against Tamworth.

Somner signed for Lewes in July 2011. He then joined Kingstonian in the summer of 2012. After a lengthy spell at Kingsmeadow, which included taking the captain's armband, he dropped to the Isthmian Division One South for the 2014–15 season, joining Walton Casuals. Managing just two appearances for the Stags, he left at the end of August and took a short break from football. However, he returned to the league in late February, joining rivals Walton & Hersham.

Career statistics

References

External links

1982 births
Living people
Footballers from Isleworth
English footballers
Welsh footballers
Wales under-21 international footballers
Association football utility players
Brentford F.C. players
Cambridge United F.C. players
Bristol Rovers F.C. players
Aldershot Town F.C. players
Notts County F.C. players
Mansfield Town F.C. players
Forest Green Rovers F.C. players
Lewes F.C. players
Kingstonian F.C. players
English Football League players
National League (English football) players
Walton Casuals F.C. players
Walton & Hersham F.C. players
Association football defenders
Association football midfielders